Dyckia fosteriana is a plant species in the genus Dyckia. This species is native to Brazil.

Cultivars
 Dyckia 'Bronze'
 Dyckia 'D. Barry'
 Dyckia 'Gypsy'
 Dyckia 'James Gray'
 Dyckia 'James Green'
 Dyckia 'Pearly Gates'
 Dyckia 'Silver King'
 Dyckia 'Silver Queen'
 Dyckia 'Vista'

References

BSI Cultivar Registry Retrieved 11 October 2009

fosteriana
Flora of Brazil